After the huge success of the previous year's Face to Face concerts Billy Joel and Elton John set out on the road again. They only reunited for twelve concerts visiting both the United States and Canada. They played from California down to Florida covering eight states and also Toronto.

The concerts took the same form as the previous year where John and Joel with their bands would perform a few songs together, then John would take to the stage with his band without Joel.  Joel would then do his own set followed by a reunion on stage with John before leaving stage.  They would return for a few songs for an encore.

Joel stated in 2012 that he would no longer tour with Elton because it restrains his setlists.

Tour dates

Setlist

References

External links

 Information Site with Tour Dates

1995 concert tours
Billy Joel concert tours
Co-headlining concert tours
Elton John concert tours